Royal Association Sportive Maccabi Brussels, founded in 1953, is a multi-sports club based in Brussels, Belgium with basketball, football, table tennis, volleyball teams.

Basketball 
The basketball department of the club has won two Belgian cups in 1983–84 and 1987–88.

Notable players

 Jim Stack
 Terence Stansbury
 Slobodan Gordić

See also
 Belgian football
 List of football clubs in Belgium

External links
 Official website

Maccabi Brussels
Maccabi Brussels
Maccabi Brussels
Maccabi
Brussels
1953 establishments in Belgium
Jews and Judaism in Brussels